Roger Fletcher may refer to:
 Roger Fletcher (cartoonist)
 Roger Fletcher (mathematician)